William Thomas Jordan (born 24 February 1998) is a New Zealand rugby union player who currently plays for the Tasman Mako in the Bunnings NPC and the  in Super Rugby. His position of choice is fullback. Jordan received the World Rugby Breakthrough Player of the Year Award in 2021.

Youth rugby 
Jordan attended Fendalton Open Air School then Cobham Intermediate then Christchurch Boys' High School in Christchurch, New Zealand. He played as fullback for the top side, and led the UC Championship in tries scored in 2015.

Professional career 
After a successful school career, Jordan made his debut for the Tasman Mako in Round 1 of the 2017 Mitre 10 Cup against  at Trafalgar Park in Nelson. In the 2017 Mitre 10 Cup season he scored 5 tries, and was second in the tournament for clean breaks. Jordan was part of the Mako side which won the Mitre 10 Cup for the first time in 2019. He was named in the South Island squad for the North vs South rugby union match in 2020, starting in the number 14 jersey in a 38–35 win for the South. After an outstanding Super Rugby Aotearoa season and scoring 2 brilliant tries in the North v South game he was named in the All Blacks squad for the 2020 Rugby Championship. Jordan made his All Blacks debut against Australia on 7 November 2020 in a 24–22 loss for New Zealand, becoming All Black number 1191. Jordan returned from injury for the final test of 2020 and scored 2 tries in a 38–0 win over Argentina. Jordan was again named in the All Blacks squad to play Tonga and Fiji in the July 2021 Steinlager Series. In the first game of the 2021 season for the All Blacks Jordan scored 5 tries against Tonga at Mount Smart Stadium in a 102–0 win for the side. He scored another 3 tries later in the year against the United States of America in a 14–104 win for the All Blacks.

References

External links
 

Tasman rugby union players
Crusaders (rugby union) players
New Zealand international rugby union players
1998 births
Living people
People educated at Christchurch Boys' High School
Rugby union fullbacks
New Zealand rugby union players
Rugby union wings
Rugby union players from Christchurch